The Lodi Hills are a mountain range in northwest Nye County, Nevada. The range lies just west of the north end of the Paradise Range and Nevada State Route 361 passes the west side of the range.

References 

Mountain ranges of Nevada
Mountain ranges of Nye County, Nevada
Mountain ranges of the Great Basin